Rueben Joseph Riley Jr. (born September 20, 1984) is a former American football offensive lineman. He was signed by the Carolina Panthers as an undrafted free agent in 2007. He played college football at Michigan.

Riley has also been a member of the Miami Dolphins, Washington Redskins, New York Giants and Hartford Colonials.

Early years
Riley was an offensive and defensive lineman at Creston High School in Grand Rapids, Michigan. Grand Rapids Creston High School is the only Grand Rapids Public School to ever go to the state finals in football (1999). Riley was a sophomore during that season.

College career

Riley played college football at the University of Michigan from 2003 to 2006 after redshirting in 2002. In 2004, he started the majority of the year as a left guard. In 2005–2006 he started at right tackle due to many injuries at the position forcing coaches to move Riley. Riley's body type was projecting him as an early round draft pick at guard but the Wolverines needed him to shore up the edge as a tackle his last two years at Michigan.

Professional career

First stint with Panthers
Riley signed with the Carolina Panthers after being passed over in the 2007 NFL Draft. He was cut on September 1, 2007, but was signed to the team's practice squad. He was re-signed during the 2008 off-season, but was waived on July 23.

Miami Dolphins
On July 26, 2008, Riley was signed by the Miami Dolphins after the team waived offensive tackle Julius Wilson. The move reunited him with Dolphins rookies offensive line mate Jake Long and quarterback Chad Henne. Riley was waived on August 3.

Second stint with Panthers
Riley was re-signed by the Panthers on August 7, 2008, after the team waived offensive tackle Charles Spencer, the same player the Panthers acquired when they waived Riley two weeks earlier. He was waived during final preseason cuts on August 30.

Washington Redskins
Riley was signed to the Washington Redskins on December 9, 2008.

New York Giants
Riley was signed to the New York Giants' on December 31, 2009. On January 5, 2010, Riley was signed to a reserved/future contract. He was waived on August 7.

Hartford Colonials
Riley was signed by the Hartford Colonials of the United Football League on September 16, 2010. He reported to the team and was the starting left tackle in the season opener with the Colonials. Four games into the season Riley dislocated his knee.

References

External links
 New York Giants bio

1984 births
Living people
Players of American football from Grand Rapids, Michigan
American football offensive tackles
American football offensive guards
Michigan Wolverines football players
Carolina Panthers players
Miami Dolphins players
Washington Redskins players
New York Giants players
Hartford Colonials players